Circle is a 2014 film written and directed by Atıl İnaç.

Plot  
In the hard-boiled world, where will the soft-shelled end up? A cozy kind of extermination is on the stage and keeping a low profile. The decadence around us is nothing less than clandestine annihilation of the civil man. Yet it is carried out so well with a grinning face, it is officially sold as transition. 
Now that the tamed indulgent is stripped of social justice, welfare, even denied the tender love of concentration camps and slavery plantations of past centuries. At least hand them a round of rope… They have high expectations from taking things in their own hands.  

Circle is a peculiar story of an ordinary man caught between an untimely romance and brave new hostile world.

Characters

Awards 
 20. Adana Golden Ball International Film Festival - Film-Yön Best Film
 20. Adana Golden Ball International Film Festival - Film-Yön Best Director 
 25. Ankara International Film Festival - Best Film 
 25. Ankara International Film Festival - Best Actor  
 25. Ankara International Film Festival - Best Actress 
 25. Ankara International Film Festival - Best Actor in Supporting Role

References 

 Festivalin yıldızı "Daire" oldu Haber7
 Atıl İnaç'ın "Daire"sinin ödülü Berkin Elvan'a ithaf edildi CNNTürk
 DAİRE Beyoğlu Sineması
 Circle-Daire 19. London Turkish Film Festival
 Daire Milliyet
 Atıl İnaç'ın 'Daire' filmi Milliyet
 ‘Circle’: Finding hope in the most bizarre places Hurriyet Daily News
 Daire filminin afişi belli oldu! Sabah
 Daire bir kez daha beyazperdede Hürriyet
 SÖYLEŞİ: Atıl İnaç'ın Daire'si ve Türkiye'de sinema Antrakt Sinema
 'Daire' filmi 16 Nisan'da seyircisi ile bir kez daha buluşacak Haber Türk
 Daire (2014) Gazete Vatan

External links 
 
 
 Daire (2014) Sinematürk
 Daire (2014) Beyazperde
 Daire (2014) Sinemalar
 Fragman Vimeo
 Circle (Daire): Istanbul Review The Hollywood Reporter

2014 films